Kuato Studios was a British Educational Video game developer. The company was based in London, United Kingdom, and focused on mobile, VR and Nintendo Switch titles. They were funded by Horizons Ventures.

References

External links
 Official website
 

Video game companies of the United Kingdom